Paragliding in Azerbaijan is quite young and even though Azerbaijan has a rich sporting heritage, little was known about the sport of paragliding and air sport, generally, at the beginning of the century. Early in the sports development some ex-parachute jumpers and short term foreign visitors were trying to develop the sport, but with no real success. As of 2015, the community consisted of about 20 pilots, members of the sporting clubs RockStone, Gilavar, Climb Club, CanFly. Pilots are required to follow Fédération Aéronautique Internationale main safety requirements and ethics.

History
One of Azerbaijan's first paragliding pilots was Huseyngulu Baghirov. Baghirov imported all the necessary equipment into the country, mostly powered paragliding, and found an experienced trainer from abroad.

Baghirov then founded the Air and Extreme Sports Federation (FAIREX) to develop mountaineering and air sports in the country. Im July 2013, with FAIREX support, Azerbaijan became the home country to the first International Paragliding Festival in the Caucasus. The participants in the festival, apart from Azerbaijani pilots, were guests from the Netherlands, Georgia, South Africa and Belgium.

References

External links
 

Adventure travel
Sport in Azerbaijan
Paragliding